Game Party: In Motion is the fourth video game in the Game Party series developed by FarSight Studios and published by Warner Bros. Interactive. As with its predecessors, In Motion is a budget title aimed towards multiplayer casual gaming with various mini-games. The game debuted during the Kinect launch and received poor reviews.

Mini-games
Horseshoes
Bocce Ball
Soccer
Double Racquets
Bean Bag Toss
Hoop Shoot
Skill ball (skee ball)
Smack a Troll
Air Hockey
Tic-Tac-Toe Faceoff

Reception
Metacritic.com lists the game as having an average score of 33/100, indicating "generally unfavorable reviews".

References

External links 
 

2010 video games
FarSight Studios games
Kinect games
Party video games
Video games developed in the United States
Warner Bros. video games
Xbox 360 games
Xbox 360-only games
Multiplayer and single-player video games